Morel-Fatio is a surname. Notable people with the surname include:

 Antoine Léon Morel-Fatio (1810–1871), French painter
 Alfred Morel-Fatio (1850–1924), French hispanist

Compound surnames
French-language surnames